Sant Harchand Singh Longowal (2 January 1932 – 20 August 1985) was the President of the Akali Dal during the Punjab insurgency of the 1980s. He had signed the Punjab accord, also known as the Rajiv-Longowal Accord along with Rajiv Gandhi on 24 July 1985. The government accepted most of the demands of Akali Dal who in turn agreed to withdraw their agitation. Less than a month after signing the Punjab accord, Sant Longowal was assassinated by Gyan Singh Leel and Jarnail Singh Halvara.

Early years
Sant Harchand Singh Longowal was born on 2 January 1932, in a family of modest means living in Gidariani, a village then in the princely state of Patiala and East Punjab States Union, but now a part of the Sangrur district of Punjab, India into a Sikh family. Under the tutelage of Sant Jodh Singh at the seminary in nearby Maujo, he studied Sikh theology and Sikh texts and practised Sikh music. As his teacher was also a member of the Akali movement, it is likely that young Harchand also imbibed the spirit of political activism at that time.

Leaving Maujo at the age of twenty-one, Harchand Singh served as scripture-reader and custodian at the village gurdwara at Heron Kalan, moving the following year to Longowal, a small town 16 kilometers south-west of Sangrur.  There, he raised a gurdwara in the memory of celebrated eighteenth-century scholar and martyr, Bhai Mani Singh.  In 1962, Harchand Singh was named head of the important historical shrine at Damdama Sahib (Talwandi Sabo), but he took on the suffix "Longowal" which remained with him for the rest of his life.  He was affectionately known as "Sant Ji"

Beginnings of political activism
Sant Longowal's life of political activism began in June 1964, when he led a demonstration for Sikh rights at the historic site of Paonta Sahib in the present-day state of Himachal Pradesh.  In 1965, Sant Longowal became the president of the Akali organization in Sangrur district and a member of the working committee of the Shiromani Akali Dal.  In 1969, he was elected to the Punjabi Legislative Assembly as the Akali candidate, defeating the Congress Party's Babu Brish Bhan, who had been chief minister of Patiala and East Punjab States Union (PEPSU).

In June 1975, the Allahabad High Court annulled election of Indira Gandhi, the then Prime Minister; she, instead of resigning, imposed the Internal Emergency and arrested thousands of leaders of opposition parties. Although no Akali leader had been arrested but the organisation decided to launch an agitation against suppression of civil  liberties. In July 1975, all the senior Akali leaders courted arrest and Sant Harcharnd Singh Longowal took over the command of the agitation which continued till January 1977. In the 1978 bye election to Lok Sabha (the Lower House), Sant Harchand Singh was offered the Akali nomination for Faridkot constituency but he declined the offer. He got Balwant Singh Ramoowalia to contest instead, who was elected from the seat.

1980s: Civil disobedience
In 1980, Longowal was recalled to preside over the Akali party. In this role, he organized large-scale campaigns of civil disobedience to win concessions from India's Central Government on the longstanding grievances of Punjab, and especially the Sikhs of Punjab.  Longowal led the Akali side in years of frustrating negotiations with Mrs. Gandhi, talks that served to undermine public faith in the course of peaceful dialogue with the government. This, in turn strengthened the hand of extremists and separatists. In December 1983 Longowal invited sikh fundamentalist Jarnail Singh Bhindranwale to take up residence in Golden Temple Complex at the Guru Nanak Niwas and later on in an adjacent building next to Akal Takht. He called the tough-minded Bhindranwale "our stave to beat the government."

The peaceful campaign to achieve justice from the central Indian government began 4 August 1982 under the leadership of the Akali party president, Harchand Singh Longowal and six other members of a designated high command, namely Parkash Singh Badal—former Chief Minister of Punjab, Gurcharan Singh Tohra—President of the Shiromani Gurdwara Parbandhak Committee, Jagdev Singh Talwandi, Surjit Singh Barnala—former Union Agriculture Minister, Sukhjinder Singh—former Punjab Minister, and Ravi Inder Singh—former Speaker of the Punjab Legislature.  All in all, it endured some twenty-two months and saw the arrest of more than 200,000 demonstrators in Amritsar. The overall campaign was marked by several individual demonstrations. One of the earliest had an unexpected outcome. When Longowal declared that Sikhs would demonstrate against the Central Government's injustices at the opening of the Asian Games scheduled to begin in Delhi on 19 November 1982, the Prime Minister called on the Chief Minister of Haryana to prevent Sikhs traveling by road or rail from neighbouring Punjab to Delhi. The Haryana police did this and in the process caused inconvenience to the civilians and army officers coming to the games. Harbans Singh, On 4 January 1983 there was a mass stoppage of traffic on the major highways. On 17 June 1983 rail traffic was halted by large-scale protests. A statewide work stoppage was held on 29 August 1983. On 26 January 1984, article 25(a) of the constitution, indicating Sikhs are Hindus, was publicly burned.

Finally, Longowal announced that as of 3 June 1984 would practice civil disobedience by refusing to pay land revenue, water and electricity bills, and block the flow of grain out of Punjab.  The Sikh coalition in opposition to the Central Government held together until September 1983, when the increasing frustrations of negotiating with the Prime Minister began to take its toll in a growing division between  Jarnail Singh Bhindranwale and Jagdev Singh Talwandi (refusing to pay land revenue, water and electricity bills, Harchand Singh Longowal.

Operation Bluestar
During Operation Blue Star, the Indian army in 1984, killed the Khalistan extremists lodged inside the Golden temple complex. The army operation happened between 1–6 June 1984. During that time, the Army escorted Sant Longowal among other leaders out of the complex.

Punjab Accord

Finally, in March 1985, the leadership of the Akali party began to be released from prison under orders from the new prime minister Rajiv Gandhi. With a view to improving the situation and creating the conditions for a negotiated settlement of Sikh demands, the prime minister's confidante, Arjun Singh who was posted as the Governor of the state, also relaxed the censorship on the Punjabi press, withdrew army control over certain districts, announced his willingness to institute a judicial enquiry into the November 1984 killings, lifted the ban on the All India Sikh Students Federation and agreed to review the cases of thousands of Sikhs imprisoned since the army's arrival in Punjab the previous June. Within a few days, the first 53 were released. A few days later, Rajiv made an effort to address the economic woes of Punjab, with its diminishing acreages and burgeoning unemployment by announcing the establishment of a rail coach factory at Kapurthala, Punjab which would need about 20,000 people.  Then, after weeks of secret negotiations, Harcharnd Singh Longowal met the Prime Minister in Delhi and on 23 July 1985 signed an eleven-point memorandum covering all the major issues which had defied resolution since the Akalis had first presented their list of demands. The accord attracted opposition from several orthodox Sikh leaders of Punjab as well as from the politicians of Haryana. Some of its promises could not be fulfilled due to the disagreements.

Death
Less than a month after signing the Punjab accord, Longowal was assassinated by the Sikhs opposed to the accord. Longowal was shot and killed on 20 August 1985 near the gurdwara in village Sherpur, 90 km from Patiala in Punjab. Assassin Gyan Singh Leel and Jarnail Singh Halvara fired bullets from a point-blank range at Longowal. The bullets had pierced his abdomen causing his death. His cremation took place on 21 August.

See also
 1984 Anti Sikh Riots

References

Cited sources
Khushwant Singh (2004) A History of the Sikhs, Volume II: 1839–2004, New Delhi; Oxford University Press. p. 355.

External links 
http://select.nytimes.com/gst/abstract.html?res=F70711FA3D5F0C728EDDA10894DD484D81&n=Top/News/World/Countries%20and%20Territories/India
https://web.archive.org/web/20090220094914/http://www.hinduonnet.com/fline/fl2326/stories/20070112002712000.htm
http://www.gurbani.net/community/Articles/harchandsingh.php
https://www.deutsches-informationszentrum-sikhreligion.de/1984_de.php – The double role of Harchand Singh Longowal

1932 births
1985 deaths
1985 murders in India
Assassinated Indian politicians
People from Punjab, India
Sikh politics
Victims of the insurgency in Punjab
People murdered in Punjab, India
Deaths by firearm in India
Shiromani Akali Dal politicians
Victims of Sikh terrorism